Edward P. Gilligan (July 13, 1959 – May 29, 2015) was the former Vice Chairman and President of American Express. He graduated from NYU. He was also a Board Member of Lincoln Center for the Performing Arts.

References

New York University Stern School of Business alumni
American Express people
American business executives
1959 births
2015 deaths